Jacob Lake may refer to:

Jacob Lake, Arizona, an unincorporated community
Jacobs Lake (St. Louis County, Minnesota), a lake